Christopher McGuire (born November 28, 1975) is an American drum set player, session drummer, drum teacher, and producer.  He is based in Milwaukee, Wisconsin, United States.

Early life and career
Christopher McGuire was raised in a musical family.  His mother is a singer and his father is an organist.  He grew up in Oxford, Ohio, United States.

In 1992, McGuire and other long-time friends and Oxford natives began the band 12 Rods.  The group moved to Minneapolis in 1995.  McGuire served as the drummer for the band from the start of their career until late September 1999 when he left the group.

In the summer of 2003, McGuire was hired as a support musician by Japanese band Quruli to temporarily fill the position of drummer for the group for summer festival performances.  However, in November 2003 he was hired by Quruli as a full-time member.  He continued on with the group, both recording and touring, for the next 11 months.  In October 2004 it was announced that Christopher would be leaving Quruli due to creative differences.  Since his departure, the group has only filled the position of drummer with temporary support musicians.

He is also the ex-drummer for American band Kid Dakota.

Other American bands and artists McGuire has performed and/or recorded with include the Legendary Jim Ruiz Group, The Melismatics, Alva Star, Great Girls Blouse, John Vanderslice, Mark Mallman, Willie Wisely, The Court & Spark, The Mountain Goats, Née Née; She, Sir; questionsinletters, West Elliot, Communist Daughter (band), and Faux Jean.

As a producer, McGuire produced Tokyo band Squadcar's second CD while in Japan.  He noted the experience as "killer".  He has also done production work for Minneapolis bands Barfly and Great Girls Blouse.

McGuire is currently a member of the band Puppies who are from his native Oxford.

He is often recognized by his very visual playing and highly positioned crash cymbal.

In November 2009, McGuire returned to Japan to perform with Japanese band Luminous Orange at a few of their concerts and record with them in the studio.  One of the tracks he recorded, titled "Yueqin Spring Moon", is featured on the band's latest release Songs of Innocence.

Discography

12 Rods
  Bliss (1993)
  gay? (1996)
  Split Personalities (1998)
  Separation Anxieties (2000)

Alva Star
  Alligators in the Lobby (2001)

Communist Daughter
  Soundtrack to the End (2010)

The Court & Spark
  Witch Season (2004)

Terry Eason
  Cry Baby EP (2002)

Great Girls Blouse
  EP No. 2 (2001)

Kid Dakota
  So Pretty (2001)
  The West Is the Future (2004)

Luminous Orange
  Songs of Innocence (2010)

Mark Mallman
  How I Lost My Life and Lived To Tell About It (2000)
  Live from First Avenue, Minneapolis (2003)
  Seven Years (2005)

The Melismatics
  Postmodern Rock (2001)

The Mountain Goats
  We Shall All Be Healed (2004)

Puppies
  Sick Machine (2007)

  - - intentionally left blank - - (2004)

Quruli
  Antenna (2004)

Squadcar
  Misses (producer) (2005)

  So Real (2016)

John Vanderslice
  Cellar Door (2004)

Notes

1975 births
Living people
American male drummers
Musicians from Minneapolis
20th-century American drummers
21st-century American drummers
20th-century American male musicians
21st-century American male musicians